"Touch a Hand, Make a Friend" is a song written by Homer Banks, Raymond Jackson and Carl Hampton, and first recorded by The Staple Singers on their  album Be What You Are.  "Touch a Hand, Make a Friend" was one of The Staple Singers most successful singles and peaked at number three on the soul chart and number twenty-three on the Hot 100 in 1973.

Chart performance

The Oak Ridge Boys version

The Oak Ridge Boys released the song in August 1985 as the second single from their album Step On Out.  It was their thirteenth number one on the country chart.

Weekly charts

Year-end charts

References

Songs about friendship
1973 singles
1985 singles
The Staple Singers songs
The Oak Ridge Boys songs
Songs written by Homer Banks
Song recordings produced by Ron Chancey
MCA Records singles
Songs written by Raymond Jackson (songwriter)
1973 songs
Songs written by Carl Hampton